The Kaohsiung Museum of Fisheries Civilization is a museum in Cianjhen District, Kaohsiung, Taiwan.

History
The origin of the museum can be traced to the establishment of a cultural museum of squid fishery in April 2002 by the Taiwan Squid Association and a cultural museum of tuna fishery in November 2003 by the Taiwan Tuna Association. Later on, the Kaohsiung City Government combined the two museums to form the Kaohsiung Museum of Fisheries Civilization after obtaining a fund of NT$20 million from the Fisheries Agency.

Exhibitions
The museum is divided into four exhibition areas, which are:
 Area A, for the far sea trawl fisheries zone, coastal and offshore fisheries zone, aquaculture zone
 Area B, tuna exhibition zone
 Area C, for the fisheries products processing zone, fisheries conservation and utilization zone
 Area D, squid exhibition zone

Transportation
The museum is accessible within walking distance southwest of Caoya Station of Kaohsiung MRT.

See also
 List of museums in Taiwan

References

2002 establishments in Taiwan
Fishing museums
Museums established in 2002
Museums in Kaohsiung